Jans der Enikel, or  Jans der Jansen Enikel, was a Viennese chronicler and narrative poet of the late 13th century.
He wrote a Weltchronik and a Fürstenbuch (a history of Vienna), both in Middle High German verse.

Name and biography

In his own works, he identifies himself as Jans, the grandson of Jans: enikel is simply the Middle High German word for "grandson" (modern German: Enkel).
The exact form of the name varies, partly because of variant spellings in the manuscripts. The 19th-century editor, Philipp Strauch, called the chronicler Jansen Enikel, intending "Jansen" as a genitive referring to the grandfather, but forms with a definite article (e.g. Jansen der Eninkel or Jansen der Enenkel) are also found in 19th-century scholarship. From the mid-20th century, Jans Enikel became common, but this raised the danger of misconstruing "Enikel" as a surname: the second edition of the Verfasserlexikon, for example, erroneously listed him as "Enikel, Jans". Since the name itself is simply Jans, and Enikel is an identifier comparable with "Jans junior", the chronicler should always be alphabetized under J, not E. More recent scholarship has either returned to the definite article "Jans der Enikel", adopted a new suggestion "Jans von Wien", or simply used "Jans" with no extension at all.

In the same passages in which he gives us his name, Jans claims to be a citizen of Vienna with full patrician rights. Elsewhere he mentions that a Herrn Jansen sun, presumably his father, was honoured by the duke in 1239, and that as a child he had seen the army marching off to the Battle of the Leitha River, which means he could not have been born much after 1240. From other sources we know that he was a member of one of the highest patrician families of Vienna, and his name appears in Viennese council records for the years 1271–1302. In these records he appears as "Jans der Schreiber", so it is likely he was secretary to the city council. These sources suggest that his father was the city judge Konrad, and his mother belonged to the powerful Paltram family. There are also references to his son and son-in-law. We even know his address, in Wildwerkerstraße, modern Wipplingerstraße. This makes him one of the best attested of all medieval German poets.

Weltchronik

The Weltchronik tells the history of the world in around 30,000 lines of verse, starting even before the six-day creation by telling of Satan's rebellion, and relating the Biblical stories of the Old Testament, then continuing with Alexander the Great and other classical Greek and Roman material, and on down the list of Emperors through Charles the Great to Frederick II, Holy Roman Emperor.

Jans is known for the free-and-easy approach he takes to his material, altering details casually for their entertainment value and incorporating motifs from the most diverse sources, for which reason 19th century writers were extremely disparaging about him: Strauch, for example, wrote him off as a "Reimschmied". One interesting feature is the unusually large amount of Jewish material he borrows. Jans is the first writer in the German language to recount the legend of Pope Joan.

The style is anecdotal, with many fun tales inserted into what might otherwise be sober history. For example, the reign of Frederick II is interrupted to tell an entirely fictional story of a nobleman named Friedrich von Antfurt. This Friedrich subjects a duchess to what we today could only call sexual harassment, to the point where she thinks up a ruse to get rid of him. She promises to give him what he wants (the poet makes no bones about the fact that he only wants her lîp, her body) provided he takes part in a joust wearing her chemise (underdress) instead of his armour.  She is of course counting on him being killed, but he survives, and there has to be a reckoning: when the duchess still refuses to submit to him, he vindictively exacts a humiliating revenge by forcing her to wear the torn and bloody chemise to church.

Other scurrilous tales include a story of Noah's son visiting his wife's bedroom on the ark in violation of a strict prohibition; of Noah discovering wine when his goat became drunk; of how the Emperor Nero gave birth to a toad; and of the enchantment that led Charles the Great to commit necrophilia.

From the 14th century, the text of the Weltchronik was reused in compilation manuscripts, which have a very complicated history. The earliest are combinations with the Christherre-Chronik known as the Enikel-Christherre-Mischtext, which in turn was developed into the so-called Erweiterte Christherr-Chronik. There are also compilation manuscripts that combine parts of Jans' Weltchronik with excerpts from Rudolf von Ems and Heinrich von München. In all, some 50 manuscripts contain text of Jans' Weltchronik, either "pure text" or compilations. Fragments are still occasionally being discovered.

The earliest manuscripts of the Weltchronik were copiously illustrated with coloured miniatures, and the original cycle of miniatures was so well integrated with the text that it was clearly part of the author's programme. Many of Jans' miniatures were also taken into the compilations. However, from the 15th century the manuscripts are gradually less well laid out, and the illustrations are no longer copied.

Fürstenbuch
The Fürstenbuch is the earliest known history of the City of Vienna, and indeed it is probably the first town chronicle in the German language. It is shorter than the Weltchronik and has received far less scholarly attention, but it is an important historical source for the development of patrician society.

For English-speaking readers, the Fürstenbuch is interesting for giving an Austrian perspective on the imprisonment of Richard Lionheart in Austria in 1193. Jans tells how Richard, travelling incognito, seeks shelter in Duke Leopold's kitchen, where he is put to work turning a goose on a spit over a fire. When he is recognized and captured, he is mocked as an edele[r] brâtaer, a "noble goose-roaster".

The account of the Austrian Duke Frederick II, the Quarrelsome contains a fictitious account of his conflict with the emperor at the Diet of Verona (1245), which nevertheless is understood as presenting a pro-Austrian slant on political reality. When the emperor invites the duke to dinner, the duke declines, claiming he has enough money to buy his own dinner. The Emperor responds by forbidding any citizen to sell him firewood for his kitchen, but the Duke outwits him by burning walnuts.

Critical text and translations
Critical edition: Philipp Strauch (ed.), Jansen Enikels Werke (MGH, Scriptores 8: Deutsche Chroniken und andere Geschichtsbücher des Mittelalters, Vol. 3), Hanover & Leipzig 1891–1900, ; Reprint Munich 1980 
Excerpts with English translations: Graeme Dunphy (ed.), History as Literature: German World Chronicles of the Thirteenth Century in Verse. Kalamazoo 2003.
English translation of the Virgil section: Jan M. Ziolkowski and Michael C. J. Putnam, The Virgilian Tradition: The First Fifteen Hundred Years, 2008, 928–930
Text and bibliography on dunphy.de

See also

Medieval German literature
Rudolf von Ems
Christherre-Chronik

Notes

References

Sources 

 
 
 
 
 
 
 
 
 
 
 
 
 
 
 
 
 

 
 
 
 
 
 

13th-century Austrian poets
13th-century historians from the Holy Roman Empire
German chroniclers
13th-century births
14th-century deaths
Middle High German literature
Austrian male poets